is a railway station on the Chikuhi Line in Itoshima, Fukuoka, Japan, and operated by Kyushu Railway Company (JR Kyushu). Named after the nearby Itoshima High School, the station opened on March 16, 2019.

Lines
Itoshima-Kōkōmae Station is served by the Chikuhi Line.

Station layout
The station has two side platforms serving a double track line. The station building is located above the platforms, and are connected to them via stairs and elevators.

Adjacent stations

History
Construction of the new station started in 2017, and the station was opened on March 16, 2019.

Passenger statistics
The station is forecasted to be used by approximately 4,800 passengers daily.

Surrounding area
 Itoshima High School

See also
 List of railway stations in Japan

References

External links

Chikuhi Line
Stations of Kyushu Railway Company
Railway stations in Fukuoka Prefecture
Railway stations in Japan opened in 2019